Chung Min-tae (Hangul: 정민태, Hanja: 鄭珉台; born March 1, 1970) is a former pitcher in the KBO League and Nippon Professional Baseball, and the current pitching coach of the Hanwha Eagles.

While attending Hanyang University, he competed for South Korea national baseball team in numerous international baseball competitions. After the amateur career, Chung played for the Pacific Dolphins / Hyundai Unicorns (1992–2000, 2003–2007) and Kia Tigers (2008) in the Korea Baseball Organization. In 2001, he signed with the Yomiuri Giants to play in Nippon Professional Baseball for two years.

He was one of the top pitchers in the KBO in the period 1998 to 2003, winning the KBO League Golden Glove Award three times during that span. He led the league in victories in three separate years — 1999, 2000, and 2003 — topping 20 victories in 1999. His Unicorns team won the Korean Series championship three times during that period, with Chung winning the Korean Series Most Valuable Player Award twice, in 2000 and 2003.

See also 
 List of KBO career win leaders
 List of KBO career strikeout leaders

References

External links 
Career statistics and player information from Korea Baseball Organization

 profile at databaseOlympics.com

Lotte Giants coaches
Kiwoom Heroes coaches
South Korean baseball coaches
1970 births
Living people
Baseball players at the 1990 Asian Games
Baseball players at the 2000 Summer Olympics
Olympic baseball players of South Korea
Olympic bronze medalists for South Korea
Pacific Dolphins players
Hyundai Unicorns players
Kia Tigers players
Korean Series MVPs
South Korean expatriate baseball players in Japan
Yomiuri Giants players
Olympic medalists in baseball

Medalists at the 2000 Summer Olympics
Sportspeople from Incheon
Asian Games competitors for South Korea